USS Courtney has been the name of more than one United States Navy ship, and may refer to:

, a patrol vessel, originally named William J. Courtney, in commission from 1917 to 1919
, a destroyer escort in commission from 1956 to 1973

See also
 , a patrol boat in commission from 1917 to 1918

United States Navy ship names